Kayah discography consists of eleven studio albums (three of which are collaborative albums), one live album, two compilation albums, one extended play (EP) and sixty singles (including nine as featured artist).

Kayah's debut album was released by Polskie Nagrania Muza. Between 1995 and 2005, her albums were released by Zic Zac and BMG Poland which morphed into Sony BMG Music Entertainment Poland. Since 2007, Kayah's subsequent albums have been released under her own label, Kayax. Five of her albums have been certified gold by ZPAV, four platinum, and one diamond. The singer has sold more than one million records in her native Poland.

Albums

Studio albums

Live albums

Compilation albums

EPs

Singles

As lead artist

As featured artist

Notes 
 A^ Polish albums sales chart OLiS was only launched in October 2000. Peak positions for Kayah's earlier albums are taken from reliable sales charts published weekly by Radio Bis and monthly by Gazeta Muzyczna.
 B^ Polish vinyl albums sales chart was only launched in 2017.
 C^ An English-language edition of Kayah was released in 1991 by Rogot.
 D^ JakaJaKayah was released internationally as YakaYaKayah.
 E^ Największe przeboje was re-released as Przeboje in 2015 as part of the Lubię polskie series.
 F^ Polish club play chart Top – Dyskoteki was only published between 2010 and 2018.

References

External links 
  (in Polish)
 Official channel on YouTube
 Kayah on Discogs

Kayah